Melbourne Terminus may refer to:

Flinders Street railway station
Southern Cross railway station
Station Pier